Zerah Barnett (born 16 April 1843 in Kaunas – 15 October 1935 in Tel Aviv) was a Zionist pioneer. He was one of the founders of Petah Tikva. He later founded Neve Shalom, a Jewish neighborhood north of Jaffa.

Biography
Barnett was born in 1843 in Kaunas (then Kovno), and studied at the Slabodka Yeshiva in the city. He married Rachel Leah HaCohen and moved to London, where he became a fur trader and Torah teacher. In 1872 he moved to Jerusalem and started a business, but it was unsuccessful and he lost all his money. He returned to London to work and save more money, before moving a second time to Jerusalem. He then got involved in building Mea Shearim, one of the first neighborhoods situated outside the Old City walls. In 1877 he co-founded Petah Tikva along with Yoel Moshe Salomon. Barnett's wife refused to join him there due to the harsh conditions, which included living in a tent surrounded by ever-present malaria. She asked for arbitration by the Ashkenazi Chief Rabbi of Jerusalem, Shmuel Salant, who having heard both sides, advised her that as a good Jewish wife, she must follow her husband.

During his residence in Jerusalem, Petah Tikva and Neve Shalom, Barnett traveled to London fifteen times in order to raise funds. On two occasions in Paris, he met with Baron Edmond James de Rothschild. As a result of this, Barnett donated a Torah scroll to the Great Synagogue in Petah Tikva. In 1880, he finally built a house there, but the mud and brick building was not sturdy enough for the wet winters, and it washed away like numerous others. After contracting malaria, Barnett moved back to London for five years, and returned in 1885 to build a new stone house. This structure, the first two-storey building in the settlement, also served as a synagogue. One year later, the house served as a fort during the defense of Petah Tikva against Arab raiders.

In 1890, Barnett sold his Petah Tikva house to buy a substantial plot of land north of Jaffa, where he founded the new Jewish neighborhood of Neve Shalom. Prominent Jewish residents from Jaffa settled there, including the chief rabbi of the city, . In 1896, Barnett donated some of the land to an educational-religious organization to be known as Shar'ei Torah, and also founded a Yeshiva named the Or Zore'ah Yeshiva.

Barnett wrote his memoirs with the help of his daughter Hanah Trager in 1929. These were published in English in 2021. 

Barnett died in 1935 in Neve Shalom, by then a suburb of Tel Aviv.

Barnett is mentioned in The Ballad of Yoel Moshe Salomon.

External links
 http://www.thejc.com/lifestyle/lifestyle-features/frum-east-ender-who-founded-tel-aviv

1843 births
1935 deaths
Jews in Ottoman Palestine
Businesspeople from Kaunas
Lithuanian Jews
Emigrants from the Russian Empire to the Ottoman Empire